Marianopoli (Sicilian: Manchi) is a comune (municipality) in the Province of Caltanissetta in the Italian region Sicily, located about  southeast of Palermo and about  northwest of Caltanissetta.

Marianopoli borders the following municipalities: Caltanissetta, Mussomeli, Petralia Sottana, Villalba.

Twin towns
 Catenanuova, Italy

References
Notes

External links
 www.comunemarianopoli.it/

Cities and towns in Sicily